Gustavo Carinhas (born 4 July 1908, date of death unknown) was a Portuguese fencer. He competed in the individual and team épée events at the 1936 Summer Olympics.

References

External links
 

1908 births
Year of death missing
Portuguese male épée fencers
Olympic fencers of Portugal
Fencers at the 1936 Summer Olympics